MAPNA Locomotive Engineering and Manufacturing Company (MLC) is an Iranian manufacturing company which was established in 2006. The company's manufacturing plant was officially inaugurated in 2012 with the objective of manufacturing 150 passenger locomotives in cooperation with Siemens, to be delivered to Iran's Railways Company (RAI). A new contract for manufacture of 50 other passenger locomotives of the same type was signed between the two companies in 2016, upon full delivery of the first batch to RAI.

Products
The company has produced single-ended Eurorunner type locomotives (IranRunner) under license from Siemens.

References

External links
MAPNA Locomotive Co. (MLC)

Engineering companies of Iran
Rolling stock manufacturers of Iran
2006 establishments in Iran